Wilhelm II, the Rich (23 April 1371 – 13 March 1425) was the second son of Margrave Frederick the Strict of Meissen and Catherine of Henneberg.

Under the Division of Chemnitz of 1382, he received the Osterland and Landsberg jointly with his brothers, Frederick I, Elector of Saxony and George (d. 1402).  When Margrave William I "the one-eyed" died in 1407, William and Frederick also inherited a part of Meissen.  Under the 1410 Treaty of Naumburg, however, the brothers agreed to a fresh division of the Meissen territory.  They agreed to divide the Osterland between themselves.  They did so in 1411; William received the larger part of the Osterland, including Leipzig, which Frederick had managed to obtain instead of Jena.

William fought at his brother's side in the Hussite war in Bohemia.  He is rumoured to have been married to Amelia of Mazovia.  According to Karlheinz Blaschke, however, he remained unmarried.

He died on 13 March 1425.

References

Ancestors

References and sources 
 

House of Wettin
Margraves of Meissen
1371 births
1425 deaths
14th-century German nobility
15th-century German nobility